Iraultza (Basque for Revolution) was a small Basque militant armed group of leftist tendency, active between 1982 and 1996 as a response to the suppression of the Basque resistance movement. It was thought to be a group of less than 50 people based in Bilbao, largely focused on the destruction of property, particularly those of American multinational corporations and against other smaller Spanish companies involved in labor disputes, in support of Workers' self-management and mobilization, although one of its attacks was responsible for the death of one individual and several for minor injuries of others. According to newspaper El País it was thought to be responsible for over 210 attacks during its existence.

The group was described by the United States government as "probably [having] committed more bombings against American business interests than any other European terrorist group".

Origin and motives 
The origins of Iraultza have been speculated by several including the James Baker/George P. Shultz-era United States Department of State, and El Pais as being formed of former members of Communist Movement of Euskadi, although the movement itself denied any link between the two organisations.

The group was reported as intending to attack property, but not civilians. Although the press had reported a manifesto had been distributed by Iraultza after its formation, their motives were not widely reported, although they were speculated upon. The ideology of Iraultza based upon their attacks conforms to the pattern of industrial sabotage against mainly American multinational corporations, banks, and corporations or institutions which were perceived as anti-worker or anti-populist. Iraultza also espoused anti-capitalistic ideological views.

Deaths

The group itself 
The majority of the deaths caused by Iraultza were to their own members while placing bombs; seven members died that way.

On 13 December 1986  Juan Carlos Gallardo was killed on Roncesvalles Avenue in Pamplona, Navarre. He had placed a bomb next to the car of an industrialist with the surname Figanda, whose sausage company was involved in a strong labor conflict at the time, and was firing workers. The device exploded next to the car, killing Gallardo.

After Gallardo's death, a moment of silence and march through was held by over 3,000 people, who also were in attendance to protest the death of Mikel Zabalza. The protest went through the streets of Pamplona, walking past the site of Gallardo's death, and some among the crowd chanted support for Iraultza and ETA, although relatives of Zabalza and other residents of Orbaizeta remained quiet.

On 1 May 1991, police confirmed that they had found several people who had been killed in an explosion in the remains of a SEAT 131 car, and identified via their identity documents María Rosa Diez Sáez (30) from Barakaldo and Jesús Fernández Miguel (40), the owner of the car, and found bank savings account documents from another person, reported as Soledad Múgica Areitioaurtena (40) from Ermua, in the wreckage. El Pais reported that Sáez and Areitioaurtena had been involved in radical assemblies, but that Miguel was unknown to authorities.

The following day, Iraultza contacted the newspaper Egin to confirm that the three fatalities were its members.  Police sources stated that the three deceased had just placed devices which had detonated in Bilbao and Barakaldo before they were killed manipulating an explosive device.

José Miguel Moros Peña 
According to the newspaper El Pais, on Friday 27 June 1986 José Miguel Moros Peña (18), a resident of Portagalete and construction worker for Urgandía, a subcontractor for firms Dragados and OCP Construcciones (as of January 2019 a part of ACS Group) was  starting a piece of drill machinery (later reported as a crane) at around 7:50 am when a bomb attached to it exploded, fatally injuring him. The bomb's timer had apparently failed to detonate the bomb, but the movement of the drill machinery was thought to have initiated the detonation.

An anonymous call was made prior to the detonation to the Santurzi Municipal Police at 11:45 pm on Monday 23 June 1986, and a bomb squad was sent out to check but reportedly found nothing. The police chief of Bilbao later stated that the police considered the call to be one of many false alarms, and did not consider checking the area again in daylight.

Incidents

Links 
 Homage in Bilbao to Iraultza´s members    Gara, 2007-05-02
 Iraultza factsheet produced by the United States Vice Presidential Task Force

References 

Basque politics
Clandestine groups
Left-wing militant groups in Spain